Raúl de Tomás Gómez (born 17 October 1994) is a Spanish professional footballer who plays as a striker for La Liga club Rayo Vallecano and the Spain national team.

He began as a youth team player at Real Madrid, making only one substitute appearance for the first team but playing and scoring regularly on loans to Córdoba, Valladolid and Rayo Vallecano of the Segunda División, winning promotion to La Liga with the last of those teams. In 2019 he joined Portuguese club Benfica for a €20 million fee, returning to Spain's top flight with Espanyol six months later for the same price.

De Tomás made his full debut for Spain in 2021.

Club career

Real Madrid

Reserve teams
Born in Madrid to a Spanish father and a Dominican mother, De Tomás joined Real Madrid's youth academy in 2004 after starting out at CD San Roque EFF. He played his first senior match on 8 April 2012, featuring the last 21 minutes for the C team in a 2–0 home win against CF Pozuelo de Alarcón in the Tercera División.

De Tomás was promoted to the third team in the middle of 2012, with the side now in Segunda División B. On 17 August 2012, he appeared in his first game for the reserves, coming on as a late substitute for Juanfran in a 2–1 away loss to Villarreal CF in the Segunda División.

On 16 December, back with the C side, De Tomás scored a hat-trick in a 5–2 home defeat of CD Marino. He continued to represent both affiliates during the season, and was definitely promoted to Castilla in September 2013.

De Tomás scored his first professional goal on 4 December 2013, netting the first in a 3–2 home victory over Girona FC. He contributed with a further six in 27 appearances over the campaign, as the B team suffered relegation.

In July 2014, De Tomás was included in the main squad for its pre-season trip to the United States. He made his competitive debut for them on 29 October of the same year, replacing Karim Benzema in a 4–1 away defeat of UE Cornellà in the round of 32 of the Copa del Rey.

Loans

On 31 August 2015, De Tomás was loaned to Córdoba CF in a season-long move. A year later, he signed with Real Valladolid also in the second tier and in a temporary deal.

De Tomás was loaned to Rayo Vallecano on 1 September 2017. He was the second-highest scorer of the season with 24 goals, including hat-tricks in victories over Lorca FC, Cultural y Deportiva Leonesa and CF Reus Deportiu, as the club from Vallecas won the league and were promoted back to the top flight; this haul was a season record for any player in its history, and he was also named Segunda División Player of the Month in February and April 2018.

On 17 June 2018, De Tomás signed a new contract with Real Madrid until 2023. Two months later, he was loaned to Rayo Vallecano for another campaign. He scored his first goal in the Spanish top tier on 22 September, but in a 5–1 home defeat against Deportivo Alavés. The following 11 January, also at the Campo de Fútbol de Vallecas, his hat-trick helped the hosts down RC Celta de Vigo 4–2.

Benfica
On 3 July 2019, De Tomás signed a five-year contract with Portuguese champions S.L. Benfica on a €20 million transfer fee. He debuted for the club as a starter in the 5–0 thrashing of crosstown rivals Sporting CP in the Supertaça Cândido de Oliveira on 4 August. He scored his first competitive goal for the side in a 3–1 loss at FC Zenit Saint Petersburg in the group stage of the UEFA Champions League, as a substitute; UEFA ordered his shirt to say his legal surname for that match, while he habitually wore his initials instead. 

During his spell at the Estádio da Luz, De Tomás scored only three goals from 17 appearances.

Espanyol
On 9 January 2020, De Tomás returned to his country's top flight, signing for RCD Espanyol on a contract lasting until 2026. The transfer fee of €20 million was a new record for the club from Barcelona, nearly doubling the €10.5 million they paid for Matías Vargas; Benfica retained 20% of his future transfer fee. Three days after joining, he made his debut away to UD San Sebastián de los Reyes in the third round of the national cup, coming on in the 61st minute for Jonathan Calleri and wrapping up a 2–0 win. On 19 January, he started in his first league game and scored the decisive goal of a 2–1 victory at Villarreal CF. He scored in each of his first five games, triggering a clause that obliged Espanyol to pay Benfica a further €500,000.

In 2020–21, De Tomás was the league's top scorer with 23 goals as the side won the title and returned to the top division one year after relegation. He was voted Player of the Month for December, scoring four times as his team won their four fixtures.

De Tomás scored in a 2–1 home win over Real Madrid on 3 October 2021 to start a run of goals in five consecutive matches, though he was sent off for an aggression towards Athletic Bilbao's Yeray Álvarez in the fourth of them. Another series of goals over five games included a red card in a 4–1 loss to Real Betis at the RCDE Stadium on 21 January and was concluded with an equaliser in a 2–2 draw in the Derbi barceloní against FC Barcelona on 13 February. With 17 goals in 34 appearances, he was joint-second top scorer in the league season behind Karim Benzema and level with Vinícius Júnior and Iago Aspas; he shared the Zarra Trophy for best domestic scorer with the latter, who had played one game more.

Return to Rayo
On 13 September 2022, De Tomás returned to Rayo Vallecano on a five-year contract. He only became available for the team's official matches starting January 2023.

International career
In November 2021, due to Ansu Fati's injury, De Tomás was called up for the first time to the senior Spain national team, ahead of 2022 FIFA World Cup qualifiers with Greece and Sweden. He won his first cap against the former, starting in a 1–0 win in Athens.

Personal life
De Tomás' father, also named Raúl (born 1967), was also a footballer and a forward. He spent most of his career in the Spanish third tier. His younger brother, Rubén, came through the youth ranks of Rayo Vallecano.

Career statistics

Club

International

Honours
Rayo Vallecano
Segunda División: 2017–18

Benfica
Supertaça Cândido de Oliveira: 2019

Espanyol
Segunda División: 2020–21

Individual
Segunda División top scorer: 2020–21
Segunda División Player of the Month: February 2018, April 2018, December 2020
Zarra Trophy: 2021–22
La Liga Team of the Season: 2021–22

Notes

References

External links

1994 births
Living people
Spanish people of Dominican Republic descent
Sportspeople of Dominican Republic descent
Footballers from Madrid
Spanish footballers
Association football forwards
La Liga players
Segunda División players
Segunda División B players
Tercera División players
Real Madrid C footballers
Real Madrid Castilla footballers
Real Madrid CF players
Córdoba CF players
Real Valladolid players
Rayo Vallecano players
RCD Espanyol footballers
Primeira Liga players
S.L. Benfica footballers
Spain youth international footballers
Spain international footballers
Spanish expatriate footballers
Expatriate footballers in Portugal
Spanish expatriate sportspeople in Portugal